German submarine U-629 was a Type VIIC U-boat built for Nazi Germany's Kriegsmarine for service during World War II.
She was laid down on 23 August 1941 by Blohm & Voss, Hamburg as yard number 605, launched on 12 May 1942 and commissioned on 2 July 1942 under Oberleutnant zur See Hans-Helmuth Bugs.

Design
German Type VIIC submarines were preceded by the shorter Type VIIB submarines. U-629 had a displacement of  when at the surface and  while submerged. She had two shafts and two  propellers.

U-629 was fitted with five  torpedo tubes (four fitted at the bow and one at the stern), fourteen torpedoes, one  SK C/35 naval gun, 220 rounds, and one twin  C/30 anti-aircraft gun. The boat had a complement of between forty-four and sixty.

Service history
The boat's career began with training at 5th U-boat Flotilla on 2 July 1942, followed by active service on 1 December 1942 as part of the 11th Flotilla. After eleven months she transferred to 1st Flotilla and stayed for the remainder of her service. In 11 patrols she sank no ships. During the eight patrol, on 4 January 1944 she was strafed and damaged in the Bay of Biscay by Wellington bomber from No. 304 Polish Bomber Squadron, but managed to return to Brest.

Wolfpacks
U-629 took part in seven wolfpacks, namely:
 Nordwind (24 – 28 January 1943)
 Nordwind (31 January – 2 February 1943)
 Taifun (2 – 4 April 1943)
 Coronel (4 – 8 December 1943)
 Coronel 1 (8 – 14 December 1943)
 Coronel 2 (14 – 17 December 1943)
 Amrum (18 – 23 December 1943)

Fate
U-629 was sunk on 7 June 1944 in the English Channel in position , by depth charges from a RAF Liberator of 53 Squadron. All hands were lost.

References

Bibliography

External links

German Type VIIC submarines
1942 ships
U-boats commissioned in 1942
Ships lost with all hands
U-boats sunk in 1944
U-boats sunk by depth charges
U-boats sunk by British aircraft
World War II shipwrecks in the English Channel
World War II submarines of Germany
Ships built in Hamburg
Maritime incidents in June 1944